Louise Burns is a Canadian singer-songwriter. Formerly a member of the band Lillix, she released her debut album as a solo artist, Mellow Drama, on April 5, 2011, on Light Organ Records. The album was longlisted for the 2011 Polaris Music Prize. She is also a member of the group Gold & Youth.

History
Mellow Drama was produced by Dave Ogilvie and Kevin James Maher.

Her second album, The Midnight Mass, was released July 9, 2013. The album was produced by Colin Stewart of The Hive and Sune Rose Wagner (Raveonettes). Her song "Emeralds Shatter" was nominated for the SOCAN Songwriting Prize in 2014.

Burns released her third album Young Mopes on February 3, 2017. It was produced by Burns, Colin Stewart (Ladyhawk, Black Mountain) and Damian Taylor (Bjork, Braids, Austra). It was long listed for the Polaris Music Prize in 2017. She received positive critical reception from The New York Times, Stereogum and CBC Music.

Burns produced the debut EP by Vancouver's FIONN, titled Sad Pagans and released on April 25, 2018.

Burns was also a guest host and writer for CBC Radio 3 from 2011 to 2017.

Her latest full-length release Portraits was released November 9, 2019. The album received positive reviews from Exclaim and The Vancouver Sun,

Discography
Mellow Drama (2011)
Singles - EP (2011)
The Midnight Mass (2013)
Young Mopes (2017)
Portraits (2019)
Element (2023)

References

1985 births
Living people
Canadian women rock singers
Canadian women singer-songwriters
Canadian singer-songwriters
Canadian indie rock musicians
Canadian indie pop musicians
Musicians from Vancouver
People from Cranbrook, British Columbia
Canadian women pop singers
21st-century Canadian women singers
Fontana Records artists